Marignane is a commune in the Bouches-du-Rhône department in the Provence-Alpes-Côte d'Azur region in southern France.

Geography
It is a component of the Aix-Marseille-Provence Metropolis, and the largest suburb of the city of Marseille. It is located 18.3 km (11.4 mi) to the northwest of Marseille.

Climate 
The climate is hot-summer mediterranean (Köppen: Csa). The city serves as the basis for data from Marseille through the weather station at the airport, which is inside Marignane's city limits.

History
In the 15th century the Count of Provence owned the land, and from 1603 to the French Revolution it belonged to the Covets. In the 17th century the Covets refurbished the castle.

Three chapels and one convent were built in the 17th and 18th century: Notre-Dame de Pitié (1635), Saint-Nicolas (1695), Sainte-Anne (1710, now demolished), and Couvent des Minimes (1695).

Population

Politics
From 1995 to 2008, the mayor has been Daniel Simonpieri, former member of the Front National and of the MNR.
Since 2008, the mayor is Eric Le Dissès.

Education
Public secondary schools:
Collège Georges Brassens (junior high school)
Lycée Maurice Genevoix (senior high school)

Private schools:
Institution Saint Louis Sainte Marie (campuses in Marignane and Gignac-la-Nerthe)

Personalities
 Aadil Assana, footballer

Transport
Marseille Provence Airport is located in Marignane.

Economy
Airbus Helicopters, the manufacturer of the Franco-German NHI NH90 and Tiger military helicopters, has its head office on the grounds of Marseille Provence Airport in Marignane.

Twin towns - sister cities
Marignane is twinned with:
 Figueres, Spain
 Göd, Hungary
 Ravanusa, Italy
 Slănic, Romania
 Wolfsburg, Germany

See also

 Étang de Berre
Communes of the Bouches-du-Rhône department

Notes

References

External links

 Official website (in French)

Communes of Bouches-du-Rhône
Bouches-du-Rhône communes articles needing translation from French Wikipedia